"Thoia Thoing" is an R&B single by R. Kelly from his 2003 album The R. in R&B Collection, Vol. 1. It peaked at number 6 on the R&B chart and number 13 on the Hot 100. In the UK, the song was a double A-side with "Step in the Name of Love" and in Germany with "Snake".

Music video
The music video is directed by Little X, who directed most of Kelly's videos at that time. R. Kelly's wife at that time, Andrea Kelly was the choreographer and main background dancer in the video.

Remixes
The official remix features Birdman & Busta Rhymes, the song is found in the Bonus CD of the DVD album "The R. in R&B Video Collection". The song can also be found on the mixtape "The Diplomats 5" featuring Cam'ron.

Track listing

UK CD single
 "Step in the Name of Love" (Remix) (Radio Edit)
 "Thoia Thoing" (Album Version)
 "Thoia Thoing" (Silk & Peoples Choice Remix)
 "Step in the Name of Love" (Remix) (Enhanced Video)

Charts

Weekly charts

Year-end charts

References

External links

2003 singles
Music videos directed by Director X
R. Kelly songs
Song recordings produced by R. Kelly
Songs written by R. Kelly